Orient National School is a co-educational School situated at Dhaldighi North, Gangarampur Municipality in Dakshin Dinajpur district of West Bengal.

References

External links
 

Gangarampur
Schools in Dakshin Dinajpur district
Educational institutions in India with year of establishment missing